Messier 43 or M43, also known as De Mairan's Nebula and NGC 1982, is a star-forming nebula with a prominent H II region in the equatorial constellation of Orion. It was discovered by the French scientist Jean-Jacques Dortous de Mairan some time before 1731, then catalogued by Charles Messier in 1769. It is physically part of the Orion Nebula (Messier 42), separate from that main nebula by a dense lane of dust known as the northeast dark lane. It is part of the much larger Orion molecular cloud complex.

This is a triple star system with the brighter component being a single-lined spectroscopic binary. The main component is a blue-white hued B-type main-sequence star with a stellar classification of B0.5V or B1V. It has  times the mass of the Sun and  times the Sun's radius. It is radiating over 26,000 times the Sun's luminosity from its photosphere at an effective temperature of 31,000 K. It is spinning rapidly with a projected rotational velocity of around 200 km/s.

The H II region is a roundish volume of ionized hydrogen. There is a dark lane crossing the whole west-centre strip from north to south, known as the M43 dark lane, which forming a swirling belt extension to the south links to Orion's northeast dark lane. All of these resemble a mixture of smoke rising from a chimney and in watercolour broad and fine dark brushstrokes, at many wavelengths.

Gallery

See also
 List of Messier objects

References and footnotes

External links

 

Messier 043
Messier 043
Orion–Cygnus Arm
Messier 043
043
Messier 043